The 1988–89 network television schedule for the four major English language commercial broadcast networks in the United States. The schedule covers primetime hours from September 1988 through August 1989. The schedule is followed by a list per network of returning series, new series, and series cancelled after the 1987–88 season.

PBS is not included; member stations have local flexibility over most of their schedules and broadcast times for network shows may vary.

New series are highlighted in bold.

All times are U.S. Eastern Time and Pacific Time (except for some live sports or events). Subtract one hour for Central, Mountain, Alaska and Hawaii-Aleutian times.

Each of the 30 highest-rated shows is listed with its rank and rating as determined by Nielsen Media Research.

Impact of the 1988 Writers Guild of America strike

The 1988 Writers Guild of America strike lasted between March 7 and August 7. During the strike, production on scripted television series across all of the major television networks was suspended. The writers' strike forced the networks to postpone the start of the fall 1988 schedule later than usual; rather than the traditional late-September/early-October start, new and returning series had their premieres delayed until late October and into November. In the interim, the networks had to rely on a hodgepodge of programming, including reruns, films, entertainment and news specials, program-length political advertising, and unscripted original series (e.g. CBS' High Risk); NBC and ABC also benefited from sports programming (NBC relied on the Summer Olympics in September and the World Series in October, while ABC had postseason baseball coverage and  moved up the start time for the early weeks of Monday Night Football from 9 p.m. ET to 8 p.m. ET  to replace MacGyver, which was not yet ready with new episodes at the time). Even though previous strikes of Hollywood employees occurred in 1980 and 1981, those strikes only had a minor effect on the production of television programs that aired in the 1980–81 and 1981–82 seasons. The 1988–89 television season was thus the first of three television seasons to have its start delayed due to issues outside of the control of the major networks; the next two instances occurred in the 2001–02 season (due to the networks' news coverage of the September 11 attacks) and the 2020–21 season (due to the suspension of television productions as a result of the COVID-19 pandemic).

Legend

Sunday

 Note: Quantum Leap had a two-hour premiere Sunday, March 26, 1989, on NBC.
 Note: The Jim Henson Hour briefly replaced The Magical World of Disney on May 14, 1989, and again between July 9-July 30.

Monday

(*) B.L. Stryker, Columbo, Gideon Oliver

Tuesday

Wednesday

Thursday

Friday

Saturday

Note: On CBS, Frank's Place consisted of reruns of the 1987-88 sitcom.

By network

ABC

Returning Series
20/20
The ABC Sunday Night Movie
China Beach
Dynasty
Full House
Growing Pains
Head of the Class
HeartBeat +
Hooperman
Just the Ten of Us
MacGyver
Mr. Belvedere
Monday Night Football
Moonlighting
Perfect Strangers
Who's the Boss?
The Wonder Years

New Series
The ABC Mystery Movie *
Anything But Love *
Coach *
A Fine Romance *
Great Circuses of the World *
Have Faith *
Incredible Sunday
Knightwatch
A Man Called Hawk *
Men *
Mission: Impossible
Murphy's Law
Police Story
The Robert Guillaume Show *
Roseanne
Studio 5-B *

Not returning from 1987–88:
Buck James
The Charmings
The Disney Sunday Movie
Dolly
Family Man
Hotel
Hothouse
I Married Dora
Just in Time
Max Headroom
Monday Night Baseball
Ohara
Once a Hero
Probe
Pursuit of Happiness
Sable
The "Slap" Maxwell Story
Sledge Hammer!
Spenser: For Hire
Supercarrier
The Thorns

CBS

Returning Series
48 Hours
60 Minutes
Beauty and the Beast
CBS Summer Playhouse
CBS Sunday Movie
The Cavanaughs +
Coming of Age
Dallas
Designing Women
The Equalizer
Falcon Crest
Jake and the Fatman +
Kate & Allie
Knots Landing
Murder, She Wrote
Newhart
Simon & Simon
The Smothers Brothers Comedy Hour +
Tour of Duty +
West 57th
Wiseguy

New Series
Almost Grown
Annie McGuire
Dirty Dancing
Doctor Doctor *
Dolphin Cove *
First Impressions
Hard Time on Planet Earth *
Heartland *
High Risk
Jesse Hawkes *
Live! Dick Clark Presents
Live-In *
Murphy Brown
Paradise
Raising Miranda
TV 101
The Van Dyke Show

Not returning from 1987–88:
Blue Skies
Cagney & Lacey
Eisenhower & Lutz
Everything's Relative
Frank's Place
High Mountain Rangers
Houston Knights
The Law & Harry McGraw
Magnum, P.I.
My Sister Sam
The Oldest Rookie
Trial and Error

Fox

Returning Series
21 Jump Street
America's Most Wanted
Duet
It's Garry Shandling's Show
Married... with Children
The Tracey Ullman Show

New Series
Beyond Tomorrow
COPS *
The Reporters

Not returning from 1987–88:
Dirty Dozen: The Series
Family Double Dare
Mr. President
The New Adventures of Beans Baxter
Second Chance/Boys Will Be Boys
Werewolf
Women in Prison

NBC

Returning Series
227
ALF
Amen
Cheers
The Cosby Show
Day by Day
A Different World
Family Ties
The Golden Girls
Highway to Heaven +
The Hogan Family @
Hunter
In the Heat of the Night
L.A. Law
Matlock
Miami Vice
My Two Dads +
NBC Sunday Night Movie
NBC Monday Night at the Movies
Night Court
Sonny Spoon

New Series
13 East *
Baby Boom
Dear John
Dream Street *
Empty Nest
Father Dowling Mysteries *
The Jim Henson Hour *
Knight & Daye *
The Magical World of Disney
Midnight Caller
Nearly Departed *
Nightingales *
One of the Boys *
Quantum Leap *
Something is Out There
Tattingers/Nick & Hillary
Unsolved Mysteries
Unsub *

Not returning from 1987–88:
Aaron's Way
Beverly Hills Buntz
The Bronx Zoo
Crime Story
The Days and Nights of Molly Dodd
The Facts of Life
The Highwayman
J.J. Starbuck
Our House
Private Eye
Rags to Riches
St. Elsewhere
A Year in the Life

Note: The * indicates that the program was introduced in midseason.

+ These shows returned as "backup" programming in midseason.

@ Formerly known as Valerie's Family.

References

United States primetime network television schedules
1988 in American television
1989 in American television